The 1968 Intercontinental Supercup was the first edition of the Intercontinental Supercup, a matchup between the European and South American past winners of the Intercontinental Cup. The two-legged tie was contested between Italian club Internazionale and Brazilian club Santos. The first match-up between Internazionale and Santos ended with the Santásticos beating Inter 1–0 at Milan's San Siro. A second leg was programmed to be disputed but Inter rejected to participate any further. Santos were declared the winners.

Participating clubs

South American zone qualifiers
This South American zone tournament was contested between November 13, 1968, and May 22, 1969, between Peñarol, Santos, and Racing, the three South American winners of the Intercontinental Cup to date. Santos won the group and qualified to the final stage.

Standings

Matches

European zone qualifiers
As the only two European winners of the Intercontinental Cup, Inter and Real Madrid were eligible for the competition. However, Real Madrid withdrew from the tournament, leaving Inter to face the South American zone winner.

Match details

First leg

Second leg 

As Inter withdrew from the second leg, Santos was declared the winner.

Goalscorers

3 goals
 Pedro Rocha (Peñarol)
 Wálter Machado da Silva (Racing)
 Toninho Guerreiro (Santos)

1 goal
 Polo Carrera (Peñarol)
 Edú (Santos)
 Negreiros (Santos)
 Pelé (Santos)
 Alberto Spencer (Peñarol)

Own goals
 Alfio Basile (Racing; for Peñarol)
 José Ramos Delgado (Santos; for Peñarol)

See also
Inter Milan in international football competitions
Santos FC in international football competitions

References
General

Specific

External links

Intercontinental Champions' Supercup
Intercontinental Supercup
Intercontinental Supercup 1968
Intercontinental Supercup
Intercontinental Supercup
Intercontinental Supercup
Intercontinental Supercup 1968